Lion Izmailov, real name Lion Moiseevich Polyak; born 5 May 1940, Moscow) is a Soviet and Russian satirist writer, screenwriter and entertainer.

Biography 
He was born in Moscow on 5 May 1940 in the family of a construction engineer Moses Aronovich Polyak (1909-1943) and a servant of Poly Moiseevna Polyak (1914-1982). At the age of three, he lost his father who died in the war (deputy commander of the battery of the 213th cannon-artillery regiment, Lieutenant  Polyak was missing in April 1943), and Lion's upbringing lay on the shoulders of the mother.

In 1960, the future writer graduated from the aviation technical school, and after 2 years of work at one of the enterprises he entered the Moscow Aviation Institute, which he graduated in 1967, receiving the specialty of  design engineer.

Published in 1969 in Literaturnaya Gazeta, since then he has been the permanent author of the  Club of 12 Chairs  column. In 1970 he became a professional writer. In 1973-1975 he studied the profession of a screenwriter (VKSR, workshop of Georgy Danelia). In 1979 he began to perform independently on the stage as a humorist. Member of the Writers' Union of the USSR (1979). He was the host of a number of popular television programs.

Izmailov's monologues are performed by such artists as Gennady Khazanov, Yevgeny Petrosyan, Jan Arlazorov, Svetlana Rozhkova, Efim Shifrin, Vladimir Vinokur, Lev Leshchenko and many others.

Lion Izmailov writes several songs by the singer and composer Alexander Dobronravov.

References

External links
 

1940 births
Living people
Writers from Moscow
Russian satirists
Soviet screenwriters
20th-century Russian screenwriters
Male screenwriters
20th-century Russian male writers
21st-century male writers
Russian television presenters
Soviet male poets
Soviet poets
Russian male poets
Russian male songwriters
Moscow Aviation Institute alumni
High Courses for Scriptwriters and Film Directors alumni
Soviet Jews
Russian Jews
Russian humorists
20th-century pseudonymous writers
21st-century pseudonymous writers